POSB Bank, often known as POSB, is a Singaporean bank offering consumer banking services and is the oldest local bank in continuous operation in Singapore. Established on 1 January 1877 as the Post Office Savings Bank, the bank now operates as part of DBS Bank, which acquired the institution and its subsidiaries on 16 November 1998.

Prior to its acquisition, the bank was a major public bank offering low-cost banking services to Singaporeans. DBS Bank attempts to continue this tradition by promising to keep costs low for basic savings accounts, and to exempt children, full-time students below the age of 21 years and full-time National Servicemen from bank charges.

History

Founded on 1 January 1877 as the Post Office Savings Bank (POSB), the bank was part of the Postal Services Department in the Straits Settlements. It was set up by the colonial government to provide banking services for lower-income citizens within the Straits Settlement. Headquartered in the General Post Office Building, in Raffles Place, the bank was under the administration of the Postmaster General and bank policies were decided by a board of trustees, which was designated by the Governor of the Straits Settlements.

From 1877 to 1940, the number of accounts opened increased from 211 to 57,000 and the total deposits increased from 19,862 to 14.3 million Straits dollars during the same period of time.

Following the end of the Second World War and the dissolution of the Straits Settlements, the 1948 Savings Bank Ordinance came into effect and in 1949, POSB was separated from the other post office savings banks in Malaya, with the bank's assets and liabilities split between Singapore and Malaya. The Malayan branch eventually became Bank Simpanan Nasional in 1974. After the separation from 1949 to 1955, the total deposits of the bank increased from M$27.4 million to M$57.6 million and in 1951, the bank had its 100,000th depositor.

Decline and revival
Reaching its peak in 1955, the bank had a slow decline from 1957 to 1966, where the total deposits decrased to M$37.4 million.

After Singapore's independence in 1965, the country went through a rapid industrialisation programme. To develop the infrastructure of the infant city-state, Minister for Finance Goh Keng Swee set up a savings bank committee, which was later reconstituted into a permanent advisory committee within the bank to promote domestic savings through POSB to provide the Singapore government with a non-inflationary source of funds for the development of the country. 

Following the recommendations of the savings bank committee, withdrawal limits of accounts were raised from S$200 once every seven days to S$500 once every three days, longer operating hours, exempting interest earned on savings accounts from taxable income, and accepting non-romanised signatures for opening accounts. Savings competitions were also organised among all public and government-aided schools to encourage students to open an account with the bank. From 1966 to 1969, the number of accounts opened increased from 10,596 to 174,506 with deposits totaling S$57.7 million in 1969.

Statutory board, new services and facilities 

In 1971, it was announced that the bank would become a statutory board under the Ministry of Communications. The Post Office Savings Bank Bill was passed in Parliament on 30 July 1971 and the bank ceased to be a branch of the Postal Services Department on 1 January 1972 after the 1971 Post Office Savings Bank of Singapore Act came into effect in that year. 

In 1974, the bank was transferred to become part of the Ministry of Finance and Credit POSB Pte Ltd was established in the same year to provide custom-tailored loans relating to HDB housing ownership.

By 1976, POSB had one million depositors, while deposits crossed the S$1 billion mark. In 1980, it introduced the Passcard, and set-up the Principal Branch. 

In 1981, its first Cash-On-Line ATM opened at the Newton Branch. 

In 1983, its headquarters were shifted to the new 8-storey complex, the POSB Bank Centre at Bras Basah Road. 

In 1984, the current account facility was introduced, and by 1986, deposits crossed the S$10 billion mark.

Acquisition by DBS Bank

The Post Office Savings Bank was renamed as POSBank in March 1990. On 24 July 1998, the Ministry of Finance announced the acquisition of POSB by DBS Bank, which was fully acquired on 16 November 1998 for S$1.6 billion; at the same time, ceased to exist as a statutory board under the Ministry of Finance. 

POSB still operates one of the highest number of bank branches in Singapore, especially in the suburban neighbourhoods, and operates the highest number of ATM outlets throughout Singapore. The integration of both banks allowed customers of either bank to share the facilities; DBS Bank depositors may use the Cash Deposit Machine installed island-wide in POSB branches and vice-versa.

See also
 DBS Bank
 Bank Simpanan Nasional – formerly the Malayan branch of the Post Office Savings Bank

References

External links
POSBank
DBS Bank

Banks of Singapore
DBS Bank
Banks established in 1877
Singaporean brands
Postal savings system
1877 establishments in the British Empire